The 2022 Shakey's Super League Collegiate Pre-Season Tournament was the inaugural tournament of Shakey's Super League.

The tournament began on 24 September and finished on 19 November 2022 at Rizal Memorial Coliseum, Manila. It features 18 collegiate teams from the two most prominent collegiate athletics associations in the country — NCAA and UAAP.

NU Lady Bulldogs defeated De La Salle Lady Spikers (3–0) in the championship match and crowned as the inaugural champions of the tournament. De La Salle Lady Spikers settled for silver. Adamson Lady Falcons won the bronze after a hard fought 5 sets against UST Golden Tigresses in the 3rd place match.

Participating teams

Pool compositions 
The teams are grouped via casting lots. Pools A and B will have 5 teams (3 NCAA, 2 UAAP), and Pools C and D will have 4 teams (2 NCAA, 2 UAAP). The overview of pools was released on 10 September 2022.

 First round

 Second round

Venue

Format 
This tournament will implement the "All to Play" system in its games, where teams will field all the players on the roster who will be given a chance to play in a match. It is a system where a team will be fielding different players (except Libero) to play in the first two sets. The substitution will take effect when the set score reaches 16. Starting from the 3rd set onwards, the standard play will return. This is the competition format that will be conducted for the entirety of the conference.

First round
 Single-round robin format; 4 pools; Teams are ranked using the FIVB Ranking System.
 The top two teams per pool will advance to the second round.
Second round
 Single-round robin format; 2 pools; Teams are ranked using the FIVB Ranking System.
 The W-L record in the first round will be carried over in the second round.
 After another pool play, the eight teams will battle in the crossover quarterfinals.
Quarterfinals (knockout stage)
 QF1: E1 vs. F4
 QF3: F2 vs. E3
 QF2: F1 vs. E4
 QF4: E2 vs. F3
Semifinals (knockout stage)
 SF1: QF #1 vs. QF #3
 SF2: QF #2 vs. QF #4
Finals (knockout stage)
 Bronze medal: SF1 Loser vs SF2 Loser
 Gold medal: SF1 Winner vs SF2 Winner

Pool standing procedure 
 Number of matches won
 Match points
 Sets ratio
 Points ratio
 If the tie continues as per the point ratio between two teams, the priority will be given to the team which won the last match between them. When the tie in points ratio is between three or more teams, a new classification of these teams in the terms of points 1, 2 and 3 will be made taking into consideration only the matches in which they were opposed to each other.

Match won 3–0 or 3–1: 3 match points for the winner, 0 match points for the loser

Match won 3–2: 2 match points for the winner, 1 match point for the loser.

First round 
 All times are Philippine Standard Time (UTC+8:00).
 The top two teams per pool advance to the second round.

Pool A 

|}

|}

Pool B 

|}

|}

Pool C 

|}

|}

Pool D 

|}

|}

Second round 
 All times are Philippine Standard Time (UTC+8:00).

Pool E 

|}

|}

Pool F 

|}

|}

Classification round 
All times are Philippines Standard Time (UTC+08:00)
The teams who are failed to qualify to the second round will face a final knockout match against teams who share a same placing from other pools (A and B, C and D).

17th place match
|}

15th place match
|}

13th place match
|}

11th place match
|}

9th place match
|}
Note:

Final round 
 All times are Philippine Standard Time (UTC+8:00).

Quarterfinals 
|}

5th–8th semifinals 
|}

7th place match 
|}

5th place match 
|}

Semifinals 
|}

3rd place match 
|}

Championship 
|}

Awards and medalists

Individual awards

Medalists

Final standings

See also 
 2022 V-League Collegiate Challenge

References 

2022 in Philippine sport
2022 in volleyball
2022 in women's volleyball